Nola fuscibasalis is a moth of the family Nolidae first described by George Hampson in 1896. It is found in Sri Lanka and Myanmar.

Description
Its larval food plant is Ziziphus mauritiana.

References

Moths of Asia
Moths described in 1896
fuscibasalis